Outlaw Brand is a 1948 American Western film directed by Lambert Hillyer and written by J. Benton Cheney. The film stars Jimmy Wakely, Dub Taylor, Kay Morley, Christine Larson, Tom Chatterton and Leonard Penn. The film was released on October 24, 1948 by Monogram Pictures.

Plot

Cast          
Jimmy Wakely as Jimmy Wakely
Dub Taylor as Cannonball
Kay Morley as Laura Chadwick
Christine Larson as Monica
Tom Chatterton as Tom Chadwick
Leonard Penn as Brent
John James as Lannigan 
Nolan Leary as Gentry
Bud Osborne as Sheriff 
Eddie Majors as Ward
Boyd Stockman as Ed Parker
Frank McCarroll as Kirk

References

External links
 

1948 films
American Western (genre) films
1948 Western (genre) films
Monogram Pictures films
Films directed by Lambert Hillyer
American black-and-white films
1940s English-language films
1940s American films